Robert Windsor may refer to:

Bob Windsor (born 1942), American football tight end
Bob Windsor (politician) (1896–1988), Australian politician
Robert Windsor (American football) (born 1997), American football defensive tackle
Robert Windsor-Clive (MP) (1824–1859), British politician
Robert Windsor-Clive, 1st Earl of Plymouth (1857–1923), politician, son of the above